This is a presentation of the phonological history of the Scots language.

Scots has its origins in Old English (OE) via early Northern Middle English; though loanwords from Old Norse and Romance sources are common, especially from ecclesiastical and legal Latin, Anglo-Norman and Middle French borrowings. Trade and immigration led to some borrowings from Middle Low German and Middle Dutch. Some vocabulary has been borrowed from Scotland's other language, Scottish Gaelic.

Consonants
OE æmerġe → Modern Scots emmers and English embers
OE þȳmel → Modern Scots thimmle and English thimble
OE timber → Modern Scots timmer and English timber

Certain clusters were reduced:
A word-final  reduced to  except in some inflected forms (e.g. Modern Scots act, expect, strict).
Modern Scots attempt, corrupt). Note that the English words like empty that come from OE words that did not have a  cluster also don’t have clusters in Scots (in this case, OE æmetiġ became Scots empy).
OE frēond, 'friend', became Modern Scots freend).
Modern Scots auld 'old').
OE  and  clusters appeared word-initially, though this feature is now highly recessive (e.g. knaw, 'know'; gnegum, 'tricky nature').

While OE  became  in Modern English, Scots has retained the original pronunciation (e.g. OE sċylfe, 'shelf', became skelf).
Old English  became  when adjacent to a front vowel (e.g. shinners from OE sinder, 'cinder').

OE  was often dropped in certain contexts:
OE delfan → Modern Scots del and English delve
OE dēofol → Modern Scots deil and English devil
OE dufe → Modern Scots dou and English dove
OE ġefan →  Modern Scots gie and English give

OE birċe → Scots birk and English birch
OE brēċ → Scots breeks and English britches
OE þæċ → Scots thack and English thatch
OE ġiċċan → Scots yeuk and English itch
OE hryċġ → Scots rig and English ridge

Word final OE  (written  or ) was deleted in a few words (e.g. OE mūþ, 'mouth', became mou in Scots).

OE  was lost in English, but remained in Scots, spelled :
OE beorht → Modern Scots bricht and English bright
OE hlōh → Modern Scots lauch and English laugh
OE þōht → Modern Scots thocht and English thought

Old English  became  for a number of speakers, though  is widespread (e.g. OE hwæt, 'what', became whit).

Metathesis occurred in some words (e.g. OE græs, 'grass', became girse).

OE  became vocalised after  resulting in the diphthong  in Modern Scots (e.g. boga, 'bow', became bowe).

Similarly, in the Early Scots period,  was vocalized after:
 (e.g. pullian, 'pull', became Modern Scots pou).

Vowels

The following table shows the modern realisation of the various Scots vowels along with their pronunciation in Early Scots, the Early Middle English vowels they can largely be derived from, and the main Old English sources of these vowels.  See also Middle English phonology for a more in-depth overview of the Old English sources of the Early Middle English vowels below.  External sources are: For the principal Old English, Norse and Romance sources of the Early Scots vowels see Aitken, A.J, (Ed. Macafee C.) (2002) pp. 89–95; for an overview of the historical developments see Vowel systems of Scots: a rough historical outline in A History of Scots to 1700, p. lvii.

Vowel 1

Similarly with Norse grice (pig), sile (strain), tyke (curr), lythe (shelter) and tyne (lose), and Romance advice, fine, cry, sybae (onion) but where Romance words entered Scots after this sound shift the original  (Vowel 2) remained in Scots, for example bapteese (baptise), ceety (city), ceevil (civil), eetem (item), leeberal (liberal), leecence (license), meenister (minister), obleege (oblige), peety (pity), poleetical (political), poseetion, releegion (religion) and speerit (spirit).

Similarly with Old French ai and ei, for example Modern Scots chyce (choice), eynment (ointment), eyster (oyster), evyte (avoid), jyne (join), ile (oil), pynt (point), syle (soil), spyle (spoil) and vyce (voice)

Vowel 2

Also grieve (overseer) from grœfa.

Vowel 3

Old English ea and ēa became  in Early Scots, merging with vowel 2 or  vowel 4 in Middle Scots depending on dialect or lexeme, except for a few Northern Scots dialects where it became ,  for example Modern Scots: beard, breid (bread), deid (dead), deif (deaf), heid (head), meat (food), steid (stead) and tread from beard, brēad, dēad, dēaf, hēafod, mete, stede and tredan.
Similarly with Romance words like beast, cheat, conceit, creitur (creature), deceit, ease, please, ream (cream), reison and seison.

Vowel 4

Similarly with Norse, for example frae (from), kail (cole) and spae (foretell) from frá, kál and spá. The vowel  occurs in other words of Norse origin, for example graith (harness), hain (spare) and lair (mud) from greiða, hagna and leir.

Similarly with aiple (apple), aix (axe), efter (after), peth (path), and wraith (wrath) from æpel, æx, æfter, pæþ and wræþþu. Similarly with Romance caird (card), cairy (carry), gairden (garden), regaird (regard), mairy (marry), mairtyr (martyr) and pairt (part).

Vowel 5

In open position o became  in Early Scots then eventually  in Modern Scots, for example: coal, foal, hole and thole endure.

Vowel 6

Old English ū became  in Early Scots then  in Middle Scots, remaining so but Stem final it became  in Southern Scots, for example Modern Scots: brou (brow), broun (brown), cou (cow), dou (dove), doun (down), house (house), hou (how), mou (mouth), mouse (mouse), nou (now), sour (sour) and thoum (thumb) from brū, brūn, cū, dūfe, dūn, hūs, hū, mūþ, mūs, nū, sūr and þūma. Similarly with Norse boun (ready), couer (cower), droup (droop) and stroup (spout), and Romance allou (allow), bouat (lantern), count (count), dout (doubt), pouder (powder) and round (round).

Vowel 6a

Similarly Romance coum (culm) and poupit (pulpit).

Vowel 7

Old English ō, ēo became  in Early Scots becoming  in Modern peripheral dialects. In Fife and parts of Perthshire Middle Scots  merged with vowel 4. In Modern central varieties it has merged with vowel 15 in short environments conditioned by the Scottish Vowel Length Rule, for example: bluid (blood), duin (done), muin (moon) and spuin (spoon) from dōn, blōd, mōna, and spōn. Similarly with Romance words like bruit (brute), fruit, schuil (school), tuin (tune), uiss (use n.).

In central varieties Middle Scots  merged with vowel 4 in long environments conditioned by the Scottish Vowel Length Rule, for example Modern Scots: buird (board), fuird (ford), fluir (floor) and muir (moor) from bōrd, fōrd, flōr and mōr along with dae (do), shae (shoe) and tae (to) from dō, scō and tō. Similarly with Norse words like Fuirsday (Thursday), luif (palm) and ruise (praise), and Romance words like puir (poor), shuir (sure), uise (use v.).

In northern varieties Middle Scots  merged with vowel 2, in Mid Northern varieties after  and  it became , for example Modern Scots: guid (good), cuil (cool), from gōd, cōl and Dutch cuit (ankle), and Romance schuil (school).
Note: But not Modern Scots fit (foot), wid (wood), wad (would), oo (wool), coud (could) and shoud/su(l)d (should).

Vowel 8

Similarly with Norse cake, gate (street), sale and scaith (damage).

Vowel 8a

Older Scots stem final  became  in Middle Scots merging with vowel 1 in Modern Scots.

Vowel 9

Older Scots  became  in Modern Scots.

Vowel 10

Early Scots  merged with vowel 1 in Modern Scots.

Vowel 11

Early Scots  in stem final positions, became  then  in Middle Scots merging with vowel 2 in Modern Scots.

Vowel 12

draw, gnaw, and law from dragan, gnagan, haga and lagu, and Norse maw (seagull) and claw from maga and clawa. blaw (blow), craw (crow), maw (mowe), sawe (sow), saul (soul) and snaw (snow) from blāwan, crāwe, māwan, sāwan, sāwol and snāwan. Similarly with Old English āg and Norse lágr which became awn (to own) and law (low).

Similarly with Norse baund (band), Dutch fraucht (freight), and Romance chancy, glanders, graund, and stank (a drain).

Vowel 12a

Similarly with Norse hause (neck) and Romance aum (alum), baw (ball) and scaud (scald).

Vowel 13

Old English ów became  in Older Scots then  in Modern Scots, for example: flowe (flow), glowe (glow), growe (grow) and stowe (stow) from flōwan, glōwan, grōwan and stówiġan.

Vowel 13a

In some dialects this is vocalising to  especially before , for example Modern Scots: bowster (bolster), bowt (bolt), cowt (colt), gowd (gold), howe (hollow), knowe (knoll), powe (poll) and towe (toll) from bolster, bolt, colt, gold, holh, cnol, polle and toll. Similarly with Romance rowe (roll) and sowder (solder), also Dutch gowf (golf).

Vowel 14

Vowel 14b(ii)
Older Scots  became  in Middle Scots then  in Modern Scots.

Vowel 15

Vowel 16

Before alveolars Old English æ became  in Early Scots, remaining so, for example Modern Scots: bress (brass), clesp (clasp), ess (ash), fest (fast), gled (glad), gless (glass), gress (grass) and hesp (hasp) from bræs, claspe, æsċe, fæst, glæd, glæs, gæs and hæpse.

Vowel 17

Old English a or æ in close position became  in Older Scots, remaining so, although  or  occasionally occur, for example Modern Scots:
back, bath, blad (leaf/blade), cat, clap, hack, mak (make), ram, rax (stretch), tak (take), wall (well for water), wash, watter (water) and waps (wasp) from bæc, bæþ, blæd, catt, clappian, haccian, macian, ram, raxan, tacan, wælla, wæsċan, wæter, and wæps. Similarly with Norse bag, flag (flagstone) and snag and Dutch pad (path).

Similarly with Norse bann (curse), stang (sting), thrang (busy) and wrang (wrong).

Vowel 18

Old English o in close position became  in Older Scots then  in Modern Scots but in some dialects became , for example: box, lock and rock.

Vowel 19

Old English u became  in Early Scots then  in Modern Scots, for example but and cut, but in some words it merged with vowel 15, for example Modern Scots: din (dun), hinnie (honey), simmer (summer), son and nit (nut) from dunn, huniġ, sumor, sunne and hnut. Similarly in some Romance words, for example Modern Scots: kimmer (commère), kiver (cover), ingan (onion), stibble (stubble) and tribble (trouble).

Word endings

Similarly with Norse windae (window).

See also 
History of the Scots language

References

Aitken, A.J, (Ed. Macafee C.) (2002) The Older Scots Vowels: A History of the Stressed Vowels of Older Scots from the Beginnings to the Eighteenth Century, The Scottish Text Society, Edinburgh.
William Grant and David D. Murison (eds) The Scottish National Dictionary (SND) (1929–1976), The Scottish national Dictionary Association, vols. I–X, Edinburgh.
 A History of Scots to 1700 in the Dictionary of the Older Scottish Tongue (DOST) Vol. 12. Oxford University Press 2002.

Phonology
Germanic phonologies
Sound laws